Kevin P. Mahaney (born March 31, 1962, in Bangor, Maine) is an American commercial real estate developer as well as a former competitive sailor who won a silver medal at the 1992 Olympic Games in Barcelona.

Education
Mahaney graduated from Middlebury College in 1984. He received an MBA from the University of Chicago Graduate School of Business in 1987. In 2007, the Middlebury College Center for the Arts (CFA) was renamed the Mahaney Center for the Arts.

Career
At the 1992 Summer Olympics, Mahaney finished in 2nd place in the soling class along with his partners Jim Brady and Doug Kern. Mahaney is the President and CEO of the Olympia Companies, a real estate development firm based out of Portland, Maine. He is also the CEO of I-Comm Connect, LLC, a software company.

Civil Lawsuit
On January 9, 2018, Mahaney was summoned to the Supreme Court of the State of New York as a defendant in a civil lawsuit.  The lawsuit's plaintiff, who used the pseudonym Julie Parker, originally alleged that Mahaney, whom she considered a close friend and mentor, helped to "cover up" her rape by Wall Street investment manager Howard Rubin in 2015, by urging her not to report the incident to the police or seek medical treatment. Parker also accused Mahaney of "emotionally manipulating" her.  The civil lawsuit alleged that as Parker began to suffer from depression and addiction after the incident, Mahaney would periodically fly out to her in Los Angeles and further remind her of the consequences of reporting the incident. Mahaney's lawyers filed a motion to dismiss the case, claiming that he had never met Rubin and never dissuaded the Plaintiff from contacting the police.  

On March 19, 2018, the Plaintiff dropped her charges against Mahaney and acknowledged that he did not personally know Rubin.

References

 

1962 births
Living people
1995 America's Cup sailors
American male sailors (sport)
Medalists at the 1992 Summer Olympics
Middlebury College alumni
North American Champions Soling
Olympic silver medalists for the United States in sailing
Sailors at the 1992 Summer Olympics – Soling
Sportspeople from Bangor, Maine
US Sailor of the Year